American politics has often settled into a two party system, which as well as involving conflict between the two parties has also involved long periods of bipartisanship.

Background
James Madison argued in The Federalist Papers that factionalism was a danger to democracies, as it involved groups pushing their interests to the detriment of the national interest. The Founding Fathers were largely nonpartisan, and did not think that political parties would play a role in American politics. However, political parties have long been a major force in American politics, and the nation has alternated between periods of intense party rivalry and partisanship, as well as periods of bipartisanship.

Periods of bipartisanship
There have been periods of bipartisanship in American politics, such as when the Republicans supported legislation by Democratic President Lyndon Johnson in the early 1960s, and when Democrats worked with Republican President Ronald Reagan in the 1980s. It is claimed that the non-partisanship in foreign policy was a precursor to the concept of modern bipartisanship in U.S. politics. This was articulated in 1912 by President William Howard Taft, who stated that the fundamental foreign policies of the United States should be raised above party differences.

More recently, this was also shown in the case of President George H. W. Bush's administration, which began with an atmosphere of bipartisanship on foreign policy in Washington. During this period, the concept of bipartisanship implied a consensus not only between the two parties but also the executive and legislative branches of the government to implement foreign policy. This was seen in the article Bipartisan Objectives for American Foreign Policy, authored by Henry Kissinger, President Nixon's Secretary of State, and Cyrus Vance, who was Secretary during President Carter's administration.

Oppositionism in 2010s
In the 2010s, there was wide disagreement between the Republicans and Democrats, because the minority party has been voting as a bloc against major legislation, according to James Fallows in The Atlantic. In 2010, the minority party has the ability to "discipline its ranks" so that none join the majority, and this situation in the Congress is unprecedented, according to Fallows. He sees this inability to have bipartisanship as evidence of a "structural failure of American government." Adviser to President Obama, Rahm Emanuel, said the period from 2008–2010 was marked by extreme partisanship. After the U.S. elections of 2010, with sizeable gains by Republicans in the House and Senate, analyst Charles Babington of the Associated Press suggested that both parties remained far apart on major issues such as immigration and Medicare while there may be chances for agreement about lesser issues such as electric cars, nuclear power, and tax breaks for businesses; Babington was not optimistic about chances for bipartisanship on major issues in the next few years.

While analyst Benedict Carey writing in The New York Times agrees political analysts tend to agree that government will continue to be divided and marked by paralysis and feuding, there was research suggesting that humans have a "profound capacity through which vicious adversaries can form alliances," according to Berkeley professor Dacher Keltner. According to Robert Siegel of National Public Radio, there was virtually no cooperation between Democrats and Republicans in the U.S. during the few years before 2010.

An analysis in The New York Times in March 2010 suggested that the present state of American politics is marked by oppositional politics which has left the voters cynical about the process. Bipartisanship requires "hard work", is "sometimes dull", and entails trying to find "common ground" but enables "serious problem solving", according to editorial writers at The Christian Science Monitor in 2010.

Impact
According to political analyst James Fallows in The Atlantic (based on a "note from someone with many decades' experience in national politics"), bipartisanship is a phenomenon belonging to a two-party system such as the political system of the United States and does not apply to a parliamentary system (such as Great Britain) since the minority party is not involved in helping write legislation or voting for it. Fallows argues that in a two-party system, the minority party can be obstructionist and thwart the actions of the majority party. although, Anne Applebaum has argued that the United Kingdom often has a bipartisan approach to politics despite appearances.

A call for bipartisanship is often made by presidents who "can't get their way in Congress," according to one view. Military policies of the Cold War and actions like the Iraq War were promoted and supported, through the mass media, as bipartisan acts.

See also
Gridlock (politics)
Problem Solvers Caucus, consisting of members of both major parties in Congress

References

External Links 

 Bipartisan Hoops (a game): https://www.timetocode.org/?5e.basketball

Political parties in the United States
American political philosophy
US